Maciej Krzykowski (born April 1, 1991), who goes by the pseudonym Av3k, is a professional Quake and ShootMania player. He has Polish nationality and resides in Ostróda. He actively competes in international Quake competitions and was signed to Razer and Dutch electronic sports team Serious Gaming and French organization Millenium, but is now signed to British organisation Endpoint. On July 8, 2007, at age 16, he became the youngest Quake champion ever after winning the Electronic Sports World Cup 2007 in Paris without losing a single map.

Biography

Quake IV (2006–2007) 
Av3k is widely regarded as the best Quake IV player ever alongside former Swedish professional gamer Johan "Toxjq" Quick and was defeated by only four other players: Anton "Cooller" Singov, Alex "Ztrider" Ingarv, Magnus "fox" Olsson, and Toxjq. He faced Johnathan "Fatal1ty" Wendel three times in competition and has gone undefeated. One of Av3k's victories is considered to be the sixth biggest moment in professional gaming by GamePro.

He was considered a prodigy player due to his young age. In 2006, he was nominated for Player of the Year and Quake Revelation of the Year by competitive gaming media around the world. In 2007, he was awarded the eSports Award's 'Breakthrough of the Year'.

Quake III (2008) 
Following Quake IV, he focused on Quake III competitions in 2008, as it became the main competitive first-person shooter. He took third place at his first competition in the game, losing to Magnus "fox" Olsson and Alexey "Cypher" Yanushevsky at the ESWC Masters of Paris event. Later that year, he won two major competitions (DreamHack and GameGune) and took third place at the ESWC Masters of Athens in Athens, Greece. He was unable to defend his Electronic Sports World Cup title as his visa to the United States was denied.

Quake Live (2009–2012) 
Following the beta launch of Quake Live, it became the main competitive first-person shooter starting in 2009, a year in which no Electronic Sports World Cup took place. This, combined with the previous cancellation of the World Series of Video Games, resulted in few remaining professional competitions. In 2010, the Electronic Sports World Cup renewed their lineup with Quake Live, as did Intel Extreme Masters. Av3k proved himself as one of the strongest players, taking second place at the European championship of the Intel Extreme Masters in 2010 and third place at the world championship.  He additionally defended his DreamHack championship in 2009 and 2010.

During DreamHack Winter 2012, Av3k announced his retirement from Quake Live due to his inability to win any major tournaments in the last two years.  He stated, "I just decided to not let people down anymore."  After his victory of the FaceIt Legends Cup, however, Av3k retracted his previous announcement and relabelled his retirement as a hiatus.  He cited his repeated losses to fellow progamer rapha demoralized him, and in response, he would take a break from Quake Live and improve his mental state.

ShootMania (2012–2016) 
In June 2012, French organization Millenium signed three players to represent their ShootMania team, consisting of three current Quake players Kevin "Strenx" Baeza, Alexey "Cypher" Yanushevsky, and Av3k.

Overwatch (2015-17) 
In late 2015, Av3k began to play Blizzard Gaming's new first-person shooter Overwatch, along with fellow former Quake players Cypher and Cooller. He played with Russian organisation ANOX and French team Owly Six, achieving few notable results. On 14 June 2017 it was announced that the Owly Six roster had disbanded.

Quake Champions (2017-present) 
Av3k returned to the Quake franchise in August 2017 with the release of Quake Champions, the most recent game in the series. On August 21 he signed with Virtus.Pro, famous for their successful Counter-Strike: Global Offensive lineup, also from Poland. His signing came after Virtus.Pro player Cypher was denied entry to the United States ahead of QuakeCon 2017. On 13 June 2018, Virtus.Pro announced it was closing its Quake Champions division.

On 19 September 2018, Av3k and Cypher signed with Belarusian organisation Nemiga Gaming. While with Nemiga, Av3k achieved a runner-up finish in Dreamhack Winter 2018. On February 16, 2019, Nemiga announced that Av3k's contract had expired and he and Cypher left the organisation, which closed its Quake Champions division.

On July 23, 2019, Av3k signed with British organisation Endpoint. On 10 August 2020 Endpoint announced that Av3k had renewed his contract for another year. Av3k co-hosts Endpoint's Quake podcast, Quake: A Game of Champions, with British commentator Zoot.

Criminal activity
On March 6, 2015, it was reported that Av3k had been arrested in Ostróda for drug possession.

Notable tournament results

Quake Live

Quake IV

Quake III Arena

Awards and nominations 

|-
|2007
|Quake 4 Player of the Year
|Global Gaming League
|
|-
|2007
|Breakthrough of the Year
|eSports Award
|
|-
|2007
|Best FPS Duel Player
|eSports Award
|
|-
|2006
|Quake Revelation of the Year
|Global Gaming League
|
|}

References

External links 
 Elo ranking on QLRanks
 Profile on Quake History
Configuration on Gamingcfg

1991 births
Living people
People from Ostróda
Quake (series) players
Polish esports players
ShootMania Storm players
Sportspeople from Warmian-Masurian Voivodeship
Polish criminals
Millenium (esports) players